The posterior vagal trunk is one of the two divisions (the other being the anterior vagal trunk) into which the vagus nerve splits as it passes through the esophageal hiatus to enter the abdominal cavity. The anterior and posterior vagal trunks together represent the inferior continuation of the esophageal nervous plexus inferior to the diaphragm.

Anatomy

Branches 
 Celiac branch
 Posterior gastric branches of posterior vagal trunk|Posterior gastric branches

References

External links
 
 https://web.archive.org/web/20071202231521/http://anatomy.med.umich.edu/modules/peritoneal_dev_module/peritoneal_03.html

Vagus nerve
Nerves of the torso